Scot Brian Kleinendorst (January 16, 1960 – December 17, 2019) was an American ice hockey defenseman.

Drafted in 1980 by the New York Rangers, Kleinendorst also played in the National Hockey League (NHL) for the Hartford Whalers and Washington Capitals. He was the brother of Kurt Kleinendorst.

Kleinendorst died on December 17, 2019, after being injured in a workplace accident at a paper mill on December 9. He suffered severe head trauma and multiple fractures after being ejected from a piece of heavy machinery he was operating, and died at a hospital in Duluth.

Career statistics

Regular season and playoffs

Awards and honors

References

External links

Profile at hockeydraftcentral.com
Profile at NHL.com

1960 births
2019 deaths
American men's ice hockey defensemen
Baltimore Skipjacks players
Binghamton Whalers players
Hartford Whalers players
Ice hockey players from Minnesota
Sportspeople from Grand Rapids, Minnesota
New York Rangers draft picks
New York Rangers players
Springfield Indians players
Tulsa Oilers (1964–1984) players
Washington Capitals players
Accidental deaths in Minnesota
Industrial accident deaths